Torin William Didenko (born 1987) is a former professional football player.

He formerly played for Hong Kong FC in the First Division League during the 2006–07 season.

References

External links
 Yau Yee League profile

1987 births
Living people
Footballers from Brussels
Hong Kong footballers
Association football midfielders
Hong Kong Premier League players
Expatriate footballers in Hong Kong
Hong Kong people of Russian descent
Australian people of Russian descent
Hong Kong FC players